Roberto Battiston is an Italian physicist, specialized in the field of fundamental physics and elementary particles, and leading experts in the physics of cosmic rays. He was the president of the Italian Space Agency (ASI)  from 2014 to 2018 and president of the Italian National Institute for Nuclear Physics (INFN) Committee on Astroparticle Physics from 2009 to 2014.

Life 
Battiston graduated in physics in 1979 at the Scuola Normale Superiore di Pisa with a thesis on the production of muons in proton-proton interactions at the CERN ISR, under the supervision of Nobel Prize laureate Samuel C. C. Ting and of Prof. Giorgio Bellettini. He went on to receive a fellowship at the Ecole Normale de Rue D’Ulm in Paris and was awarded a Doctorate at University of Paris XI, Orsay.

From 1983 to 2012, he was first researcher and then, from 1993, full professor in physics at University of Perugia. In 2009, he was elected for a three-years mandate as president of the National Commission for Astroparticle Physics of the National Institute of Nuclear Physics (INFN).
He moved in 2012 he moved to the Department of Physics of the University of Trento, where he holds the chair in Experimental Physics and where he contributed in founding the new INFN National Center, TIFPA (Trento Institute for Fundamental Physics and Applications), devoted to space physics and technology in the astroparticle sector.

On 16 May 2014, following a competitive selection by an international committee, he was appointed by Minister Stefania Giannini President of the Italian Space Agency (ASI) for 2014–2018.

Scientific contributions

Particle Physics 

In 1990 he started a collaboration with the Nobel laureate Samuel Ting on the L3 experiment at the LEP of CERN, designing and constructing a high-precision silicon detector to detect particles with a very short lifetime.

Alpha Magnetic Spectrometer 

From 1995 to 2014, his scientific activity was mainly devoted to a new area of research, astroparticle physics, with advanced elementary particle detectors used to characterize primordial antimatter and dark matter, two important open issues of modern astrophysics and cosmology. He participated to the design and construction of the Alpha Magnetic Spectrometer (AMS) in the role of deputy spokesperson. After the successful engineering mission on the Space Shuttle (AMS-01), the final version, AMS-02, was installed on the International Space Station in 2011 and has been collecting data ever since.

CSES (China Seismo-Electromagnetic Satellite) - LIMADOU 

Since 2007, he coordinates the Italian delegation in the joint Sino-Italian development of the Chinese satellite CSES, dedicated to the development of new techniques for the monitoring of seismic phenomena from space. The launch of the satellite, which took place in 2018, opens up new perspectives in the field of Earth observation from space and will be followed by a second satellite in 2022.

Space and  Industrial Policy

ASI presidency 

Under his presidency of the ASI, important programs involving the Agency were launched: 
 completion of the financing and construction of the COSMO-SkyMed Second Generation (satellites 1 and 2),
 completion and construction of the PRISMA multispectral satellite
 launch of the PLATiNO (Small High-Tech Satellites) program aimed at developing industrial capacity in the low-mass satellite sector
 launch of  the first European Venture Capital space fund
 creation of the Edoardo Amaldi Foundation devoted to technology transfer in the space sector

Publications 

As of August 25, 2020, Web of Science reports Battiston as author of 486 published papers, with 17.350 citations received and an H index of 58.

Battiston is a columnist for La Stampa, L'Adige, La Repubblica, and he wrote for a long time the "Astri e Particelle" ("Stars and Particles") section in Le Scienze (Italian version of Scientific American). He also authored the following books:

Awards and acknowledgments 

 Asteroid 21256 Robertobattiston was named after him
 Awardee of the ASAS Space Economy 2017 prize by the Association for ICT Services, Applications and Technologies for Space
 Recipient of the 2017 GAL Hassin Prize, together with the astrophysicist Nicolò D'Amico
 Awardee of the Vladimir Syromniatnikov  IAASS prize (2017) 
 Second Italian ever, in 2019, to enter the Hall of Fame of the International Astronautical Federation
 Awardee of the "International Science and Technology Cooperation Award" by the Chinese government (2019)

Honors 

 : Commendatore of the Order of Merit for Labour (2018)
 : Knight of the Order of the Legion of Honor (2017)

References

21st-century Italian physicists
Commanders of the Order of Merit of the Italian Republic
Scuola Normale Superiore di Pisa alumni
Living people
1956 births
People from Trento
People associated with CERN
20th-century Italian physicists